The Great Aquarium – Saint-Malo is an aquarium in Saint-Malo, France. It opened in 1996 and now belongs to the group Compagnie des Alpes, which also owns many other parks in France and Europe.
The aquarium houses 11,000 marine animals representing 600 species.
360,000 people visit this site each year making it the second most visited tourist site in Brittany.

History 

 1996 – Opening of the aquarium, the project was initiated by Maurice Chicheportiche.
 1997 - Launch of the 3D movie.
 1998 - Creation of the touch pool
 1999 - Acquisition of the Great Aquarium by the Compagnie des Alpes group. Frédéric Charlot is the new director.
 2000 - The visit is fully redesigned
 2001 - Creation of the "Nautibus"
 2002 - Nautibus receives the Themed Entertainment Association Award for its design and the Tourism Trophy of the Ille-et-Vilaine department
 2003 - Several partners, including the Great Aquarium create the eco-association "Caution! Sea in danger"
 2004 - Creation of "In Blue" a Sensory attraction
 2006 - The Great Aquarium celebrates his 10th birthday
 2007 - New logo and colours

The visit and the attractions 

During the visit, you can discover the underwater world in different rooms:
 Cold and temperate seas
 Tropical collection
 Mangrove
 The wreck of the ship where sharks dominates.

Three attractions complete the visit:
 The touch pool that allows you to touch some marine species of the Brittany coast such as rays, bats, sea stars and spiders
 A sharks ring. 7 sharks (4 different species) and 4 sea turtles swim in a basin which contains  of water and completely encircles the room. You can also spend one night in the heart of this ring, surrounded by sharks.

Caution! Sea in danger 

The association was created in 2003 at the initiative of the aquarium with some partners such as the city of Saint-Malo. Caution! Sea in Danger aims to sensitize and educate people about dangers that threaten the sea and the shorelines.
Its scope extends throughout the Emerald Coast, and they initiate various operations such as cleaning of natural sites, lessons for children during classrooms or participation at the "Ocean world day" established in 1992 by the United Nations.

Notes

External links
 
 Caution Sea in danger

Aquaria in France
Compagnie des Alpes
Buildings and structures in Ille-et-Vilaine
Tourist attractions in Ille-et-Vilaine
Saint-Malo